Fort Vermilion is a hamlet on the Peace River in northern Alberta, Canada, within Mackenzie County.

Established in 1788, Fort Vermilion shares the title of oldest European settlement in Alberta with Fort Chipewyan. Fort Vermilion contains many modern amenities to serve its inhabitants as well as the surrounding rural community. The municipal office of Mackenzie County, Alberta's largest municipality by land area, is located in Fort Vermilion.

The hamlet is located in Census Division No. 17.

History 

The area was inhabited by Dane-zaa (Beaver), Dene and later Cree First Nations long before the arrival of European traders and settlers.

Named for the vermilion coloured clays lining the river banks, Fort Vermilion started as a trading community for the North West Company, upstream of the impassible Vermilion Chutes.
The fort was established in 1788, following the expeditions of Alexander MacKenzie. Winter residents would trade furs with the native trappers, then send the furs by river during the summer to exchange points to the east and then to Montreal. The fort was later transferred to the Hudson's Bay Company after the 1821 merger. By 1830, it was a prosperous fur trading post. The first Anglican church was built in 1877.

The main access to the settlements was by means of the river, using river boats and then ferries to haul materials in the summer months, when the water was not frozen. In 1974 a bridge was built over the Peace River immediately west of Fort Vermilion, effectively ending the winter isolation of the community.

The original Old Bay House, home of the chief factor, still exists and is now part of the Fort Vermilion National Historic Site. It was listed as such in 1968, for its importance as site of North West Company and Hudson's Bay Company posts.

The visitor centre is hosted in a 1923 dovetailed log house. Built on the banks of the Peace River, it was moved to its current location in 1983. Another heritage building is the 1907 Clark House, built for the Hudson's Bay clerk quarters, and moved in 1994 to the present location near the visitor centre. The Trappers Shack, built in 1912, is another dovetailed log house. It was listed as a provincial historic site.

In 2018 the airport was named after Canadian Wop May, former bush pilot and WW1 flying ace. It was to Fort Vermilion that May flew to in 1929 with lifesaving drugs.

Demographics 

The population of Fort Vermilion according to the 2018 municipal census conducted by Mackenzie County is 763.

Education 
Two schools are located in Fort Vermilion, both administered by the Fort Vermilion School Division No. 52.

Fort Vermilion Public is part of the public school system and offers education from grade 6 to grade 12. Approximately 150 students attend this school. St. Mary's Elementary functions in the Catholic school system and is a kindergarten to grade 6 school. It has approximately 145 students.

The Northern Lakes College, established in 1999, has one of its 26 campuses in Fort Vermilion. It was previously known as Alberta Vocational Centre Grouard, and offered education to First Nations students.

Geography 

The hamlet is one of the northernmost communities in the Peace River Country. Peace Country, in the aspen parkland biome, is Canada's northernmost land suitable for agriculture. The landscape is dominated by aspen, poplars and spruce, occasionally interspersed with areas of grasslands. Wildlife is abundant in the area, and includes bears, moose, deer, beavers, foxes, coyotes and Canada geese.

Climate
Despite being so high in latitude, Fort Vermilion experiences a humid continental climate (Dfb), with long, cold winters and brief but fairly warm summers. Summer days benefit from long hours of daylight due to its northern location.

Infrastructure 

The Community Complex includes a hockey rink, a dance hall and a curling rink. The Fort Vermilion Heritage Centre manages 25 sites (listed as both provincial and national historic sites), including the old log houses, the Dominion Experimental Farm, First Nations and natural history exhibits. Also located at the community complex is a RV waste dumping site and potable water refill location. The community complex also boasts workout facilities, a splash park, ball diamonds and playground -making it a great stop to relax and cool off on hot summer days.

St. Theresa General Hospital is a building built in 1983, offering 26 acute-care beds and 8 long-term-care beds, as well as an emergency department. It employs approximately 76 health workers, and is administered by Alberta Health Services. The Provincial Court of Alberta maintains a circuit court in Fort Vermilion, with the base point located in High Level. The court used to reside in the old hospital building but now has its own facility beside St. Marys school. The old hospital building has been re-purposed as an office place for MARA (Mackenzie Applied Research Association) at the experimental farm.

The Fantasy North Golf & Country Club is a 9-hole golf course with a 150-year history. Additional facilities include a mini golf park, driving range and clubhouse.

The hamlet also has by a public library and four churches. St. Theresa Catholic Church, Church of God in Christ, Faith Gospel Fellowship church and St. Lukes Anglican Church. The St. Luke's Anglican Church Cemetery dates back to 1877. Located east of the settlement is the Fort Vermilion (Wop May Memorial) Aerodrome , administered by Mackenzie County. It is an airport that serves the area with Provincial Air Ambulance services, as well as aerial firefighting. CanWest Air operates a base here with a charter and medevac aircraft. There is also a small heliport, Fort Vermilion/Country Gardens B&B Heliport.

The event features cattle roping and bucking broncos along with other competition. Other events and festivals held in Fort Vermilion include Canada Day celebrations, Town and Country Fair, River Daze and Arts and Crafts Show.

DA Thomas park is a day use area in Fort Vermilion that provides picnic tables with campfire spots and a boat launch. There are a number of beaches along the peace river that are accessible by boat (upstream and downstream). In North Vermilion (Buttertown) there is a beach accessible by road.

Government 
Fort Vermilion is in the federal riding of Peace River—Westlock, represented by MP Arnold Viersen. Prior to the 2012 redistribution of federal electoral riding boundaries, the land was part of the Peace River electoral district.

Notable residents 
Fred Brick, husband to Sarah Lendrum (formerly of the Strathcona area), was an early businessman, farmer and trader at Fort Vermilion. Sarah came to join Fred at Fort Vermilion in 1896.

Fort Vermilion was home to cowboy Kenton Randle, known as "Rugged". Born 1960 and deceased 23 November 2003. Kenton was the bareback bronc rider who represented Canada at the 2002 Olympics in Salt Lake City. In November 2015 he was inducted into the Canadian Pro Rodeo Hall of Fame as a Legend of Rodeo.

Fort Vermilion was the childhood home of writers and brothers Will Ferguson and Ian Ferguson.  Will vividly describes his childhood there in his memoirs Beauty Tips from Moose Jaw. He mentions that the town was included in the 1976 version of Ghost Towns of Alberta, much to the chagrin of its residents at that time.

Dave Hancock, named 15th premier of Alberta on 23 March 2014 following the resignation of Alison Redford, grew up in Fort Vermilion.

Gloria Chomiak Atamanenko, a social worker, writer, and translator, was born in Fort Vermilion.

See also 
List of communities in Alberta
List of designated places in Alberta
List of hamlets in Alberta

References 

Hamlets in Alberta
Hudson's Bay Company forts
Designated places in Alberta
National Historic Sites in Alberta
Mackenzie County
Fur trade National Historic Sites of Canada
Forts or trading posts on the National Historic Sites of Canada register
Forts in Alberta